Felmingham is a village and civil parish in the English county of Norfolk.

History
Felmingham's name is of Anglo-Saxon origin and derives from the Old English for the homestead or village of Felma's people.

Nearby Stow Heath has evidence of Bronze Age round barrows and ring ditches at the confluence of the Skeyton and Blackwater Becks.

Within the parish, several Roman artefacts have been discovered including pottery remains, busts, figurines, coins and a rare cast for Iceni brooches, which points to the possible site of a Roman temple. The majority of the artefacts were found in 1844 and classified under the Felmingham Hoard, which was acquired by the British Museum in 1925.

In the Domesday Book, Felmingham is listed as a settlement of 33 households in the hundred of Tunstead. In 1086, the village was divided between the East Anglian estates of King William I, Roger Bigod and St Benet's Abbey.

During the Peasants' Revolt of 1381, a Felmingham dyer named Geoffrey Litster gathered a group of rebels and attempted to march on Norwich. The rebels were met by the forces of the crown, led by Henry le Despenser, Bishop of Norwich, at the Battle of North Walsham. Le Despenser crushed the rebel force and captured Litster and the ringleaders of the rebellion, who were subsequently executed by method of Hanged, drawn and quartered. The quarters of Litster were displayed in Norwich, Great Yarmouth, King's Lynn and Felmingham as a warning to the people.

Felmingham Hall was built in the late-Sixteenth Century and still stands today as a Grade II listed building. Ruggs Hall was also built in the Sixteenth Century but was demolished in the Nineteenth Century, with a farmhouse now standing on its original site.

During the Second World War, two B-24 Liberators of the United States Army Air Forces collided in mid-air above North Walsham. Both aircraft crashed within the parish, one on Bryant's Heath and another in Lord Anson's Wood.

Geography
According to the 2011 Census, Felmingham has a population of 561 residents living in 234 households.

Felmingham falls within the constituency of North Norfolk and is represented at Parliament by Duncan Baker MP of the Conservative Party. For the purposes of local government, the parish falls within the district of North Norfolk.

Felmingham is situated along Weavers' Way, a  footpath between Aylsham and Great Yarmouth. The footpath roughly follows the disused trackbed of the Aylsham-Yarmouth route of the Midland and Great Northern Joint Railway.

St. Andrew's Church
Felmingham's parish church is dedicated to Saint Andrew and was rebuilt in the Eighteenth Century on the site of previous worship. The font is made from Purbeck Marble and the church features a brass monument to Robert Moone who died in 1591. St. Andrew's also features numerous examples of stained-glass windows with some salvaged from the demolished St. Philip's Church at Potter Heigham with further depictions of the Ascension and the Coronation of the Virgin installed by William Morris and Geoffrey Webb. St. Andrew's has a peal of nine bells in the belfry and a hand-carved screen commissioned for the Millennium depicting scenes from the New Testament.

Transport
Felmingham railway station opened in 1883 as a stop on the Midland and Great Northern Joint Railway stretch between Melton Constable and Yarmouth Beach. The station closed in 1959, with the railway infrastructure being diverted for residential use. The closest railway station to the village today is North Walsham for the Bittern Line.

Bryant's Heath

Bryant's Heath is a nearby beauty spot and a designated Site of Special Scientific Interest. The heath is a good example of wet and dry heathland and fenland with a number of uncommon species of moss and lichen.

War Memorial
Felmingham war memorial takes the form of an inscribed granite slab which was unveiled and re-dedicated in August 2018 in the presence of Graham James, Bishop of Norwich. The memorial is located inside St. Andrew's Churchyard and lists the following names for the First World War:
 Sgt. Albert J. Whitwood (d.1916), 8th Battalion, Royal Norfolk Regiment
 O-Smn. Frederick W. Self (1889-1918), HMS Vehement
 Pvt. James E. Self (d.1917), 2nd Battalion, Royal East Kent Regiment
 Pvt. Herbert E. Self (d.1918), 8th Battalion, East Surrey Regiment
 Pvt. Torrance A. Brett (1897-1917), 9th Battalion, Suffolk Regiment
 Frederick Buck

And, the following for the Second World War:
 Sgt. George W. Mount (1921-1945), No. 358 Squadron RAF
 Pvt. James H. Wright (1914-1942), 1st Battalion, Bedfordshire and Hertfordshire Regiment
 Pvt. Cecil F. Hall (1922-1944), 5th Battalion, Royal Norfolk Regiment
 Pvt. Leonard J. Hicks (1921-1939), 5th Bn., Royal Norfolk Regt.
 Pvt. John Daniels (1921-1942), 4th Battalion, Queen's Royal Regiment
 John E. Beales

References

External links

 Felmingham Village Website

Villages in Norfolk
North Norfolk
Civil parishes in Norfolk